Patricia Dorothy Hillas (called Tricia; born 1966) is a Church of England priest. She has served as Chaplain to the Speaker of the House of Commons since 2020 and a Canon of Westminster since 2021.

Early life 
Hillas was born in 1966  in Kuala Lumpur, Malaysia, to an Indian mother and a British father. She moved to the UK with her family in 1971. She trained as a social worker, before her ordination in 2002. She completed a MSc in conflict resolution and mediation in the 2010s.

Career 
Before Hillas's ordination she was a youth and social worker specialising in supporting those diagnosed with HIV and AIDS.

She was ordained deacon in 2002 and priest in 2003. She served her curacy (2002 to 2005) at the Kensal Rise Team Ministry. From 2005 to 2014 she was vicar of St Barnabas Northolt Park. From 2014 until 2020 she was Canon Pastor at St Paul's Cathedral. She was inaugurated as Speaker's Chaplain on 4 March 2020 and appointed as the Priest-in-Charge of St Mary-at-Hill, City of London, at a similar time; but she resigned the parish post when she was appointed to her canonry.

Remaining Speaker's Chaplain, Hillas was also installed as a Canon of Westminster on 9 May 2021; she became Canon Steward and Archdeacon of Westminster shortly afterwards (before 31 May 2021).

In the aftermath of the Grenfell Tower fire, Hillas led a team supporting the families of victims.

On 13 May 2021, she led a short service to commemorate the 80th anniversary of the bombing of Parliament in World War II.

Personal life 
Hillas has been married to Andrew Hillas, who is head of the youth offending service for Southwark.

References 

1966 births
Living people
21st-century English Anglican priests
Chaplains of the House of Commons (UK)
Malaysian emigrants to the United Kingdom
English people of Indian descent
Women Anglican clergy